Catherine Labouré (May 2, 1806 – December 31, 1876) was a French member of the Daughters of Charity of Saint Vincent de Paul and a Marian visionary. She is believed to have relayed the request from the Blessed Virgin Mary to create the famous Miraculous Medal of Our Lady of Graces worn by millions of people around the world. Labouré spent forty years caring for the aged and infirm. For this, she is called the patroness of seniors.

Childhood and youth
Labouré was born on 2 May, 1806, in the Burgundy region of France to Madeleine Louise Gontard and Pierre Labouré, a farmer. She was the 9th of 11 living children. Her baptismal name was Zoe, but her family rarely used that name. Labouré's mother died on 9 October, 1815, when Labouré was nine years old. It is said that after her mother's funeral, Labouré picked up a statue of the Blessed Virgin Mary and kissed it, saying, "Now you will be my mother." 

Her father's sister offered to care for her and her sister Marie Antoinette and the sisters moved to their aunt's house at Saint-Rémy, a village  from their home. It is there that Catherine had a dream of a priest, whom she later recognised as Vincent de Paul. The priest said to her: 'My daughter, it is good to care for the sick.  For now, you flee from me, but one day you will be glad to approach me. God has plans for you. Don't forget it!'.

At the age of 12, Catherine returned to her father's farm to help care for her family. Later, her father, wishing to deter her from her religious vocation, sent her to Paris to work in his brothers’ eating establishment for poor workers.  There, she observed their suffering and her decision to enter the nursing order of Saint Vincent de Paul, the Daughters of Charity, was reinforced. 

Labouré began her noviciate on April 21, 1830 at the convent on the rue du Bac in Paris and on, January 30, 1831, she took her vows. It is at this Convent that she had the visions of the Virgin Mary that led to the creation of the Miraculous Medal.

Visions

Vincent de Paul
In April 1830, the remains of Vincent de Paul were translated to the Vincentian church in Paris. The solemnities included a novena. On three successive evenings, upon returning from the church to the rue du Bac, Catherine reportedly experienced, in the convent chapel, a vision of what she took to be the heart of de Paul above a shrine containing a relic of bone from his right arm. Each time the heart appeared a different color: white, red, and black. She interpreted this to mean that the Vincentian communities would prosper, and that there would be a change of government. The convent chaplain advised her to forget the matter.

Blessed Virgin Mary
Labouré stated that on July 19, 1830, the eve of the feast of St. Vincent de Paul, she woke up after hearing the voice of a child calling her to the chapel, where she heard the Virgin Mary say to her, "God wishes to charge you with a mission. You will be contradicted, but do not fear; you will have the grace to do what is necessary. Tell your spiritual director all that passes within you. Times are evil in France and in the world".

On November 27, 1830, Labouré reported that Mary returned to her during evening meditations. She displayed herself inside an oval frame, standing upon a globe; rays of light came out of her hands in the direction of a globe. Around the margin of the frame appeared the words "O Mary, conceived without sin, pray for us who have recourse to thee." As Labouré watched, the frame seemed to rotate, showing a circle of twelve stars, a large letter M surmounted by a cross, and the stylized Sacred Heart of Jesus and Immaculate Heart of Mary underneath. Asked why some of the rays of light did not reach the earth, Mary reportedly replied, "Those are the graces for which people forget to ask." Mary then asked her to take these images to her father confessor, telling him that they should be put on medallions. "All who wear them will receive great graces."

Labouré did so, and after two years of investigation and observation of her normal daily behavior, the priest took the information to his archbishop without revealing her identity. The request was approved and the design of the medallions was commissioned through French goldsmith Adrien Vachette. They proved to be exceedingly popular -- the Miraculous Medal was quickly adopted by millions of the Catholic faithful. It also played an important role in the proclamation by Pope Pius IX of the Immaculate Conception on December 8, 1854. The dogma of the Immaculate Conception had not yet been officially promulgated, but the medal, with its "conceived without sin" slogan, was influential in popular approval of the idea.

Later life and service to the poor and elderly

Immediately after taking her vows, Labouré was sent to the Hospice d'Enghien, located in the village of Reuilly, which, at the time, was slightly outside the city limits of Paris. She spent the next forty years there, caring for the elderly and infirm. For this, she is called the patroness of seniors.

During this time, she not only cared for the sick, but also worked on the hospice's farm, looked after the poultry and cleaned the stables. Her life was notable for her devotion to the poor and elderly and for her humility and profound silence.

Death and legacy
Labouré died in the Hospice on December 31, 1876, at the age of 70. Her body was later moved and is now encased in glass beneath the side altar in the Chapel of Our Lady of Graces of the Miraculous Medal in 140 Rue du Bac, Paris.

Her cause for sainthood was declared upon discovery that her body was incorrupt. She was beatified on May 28, 1933, by Pope Pius XI and canonized on July 27, 1947, by Pope Pius XII.

Labouré's feast day is observed on November 28 according to the liturgical calendar of the Congregation of the Mission, the Daughters of Charity of Saint Vincent de Paul and the Roman Catholic Archdiocese of Paris. She is listed in the Martyrologium Romanum for December 31.

Gallery

See also
 Alliance of the Hearts of Jesus and Mary
 Chapel of Our Lady of the Miraculous Medal
 Green Scapular
 Miraculous Medal
 Saint Catherine Labouré, Patron Saint Archive

Citations

General bibliography 
 Saint Catherine Labouré of the Miraculous Medal, by Joseph I Dirvin, CM, TAN Books and Publishers, Inc, 1958/84. 
 Saint Catherine Labouré and the Miraculous Medal, Alma Power-Waters, Ignatius Press, San Francisco, 1962. 
 The Life of Catherine Labouré, by René Laurentin, Collins, 1980.

External links 

  Full text of official biography.
 
 

1806 births
1876 deaths
People from Côte-d'Or
Daughters and Sisters of Charity of St. Vincent de Paul
French Roman Catholic saints
Marian visionaries
19th-century Christian saints
Catholic Mariology
Incorrupt saints
Vincentian saints
Christian female saints of the Late Modern era
Canonizations by Pope Pius XII